The Massachusetts State House, also known as the Massachusetts Statehouse or the New State House, is the state capitol and seat of government for the Commonwealth of Massachusetts, located in the Beacon Hill neighborhood of Boston. The building houses the Massachusetts General Court (state legislature) and the offices of the Governor of Massachusetts. The building, designed by architect Charles Bulfinch, was completed in January 1798 at a cost of $133,333 (more than five times the budget), and has repeatedly been enlarged since. It is one of the oldest state capitols in current use. It is considered a masterpiece of Federal architecture and among Bulfinch's finest works, and was designated a National Historic Landmark for its architectural significance.

Building and grounds

It was built on land once owned by John Hancock, Massachusetts's first elected governor. The Masonic cornerstone ceremony took place on July 4, 1795, with Paul Revere, Deputy Grand Master of the Grand Lodge of Massachusetts, presiding.

Before the current State House was completed in 1798, Massachusetts's government house was the Old State House on what is now Washington Street. For the building's design, architect Charles Bulfinch made use of two existing buildings in London: William Chambers's Somerset House, and James Wyatt's Pantheon.

After Maine separated from Massachusetts and became an independent state in 1820, Charles Bulfinch designed Maine's capitol building with architectural influence of the Massachusetts Capitol building with a simplified Greek Revival influence.

The Commonwealth completed a major expansion of the original building in 1895. The architect for the annex was Bostonian Charles Brigham.

In 1917, the east and west wings, designed by architects Sturgis, Bryant, Chapman & Andrews, were completed.

In July 2016, Governor Charlie Baker proposed to the state legislature to sell  of permanent easement on the west side of the State House lawn to a neighboring condominium. The land in question was once pasture owned by John Hancock and the easement would allow for the addition of au pair units.

Dome
The original wood dome, which leaked, was covered with copper in 1802 by Paul Revere's Revere Copper Company. Revere was the first American to roll copper successfully into sheets (for copper sheathing) in a commercially viable manner.

The dome was first painted gray and then light yellow before being gilded with gold leaf in 1874. During World War II, the dome was painted gray once again, to prevent reflection during blackouts and to protect the city and building from bombing attacks. The dome was re-gilded in 1969, at a cost of $36,000.   Then, in July 1997, the dome was once again re-gilded, in 23k gold. The estimated cost this time was $1.5 million. 

The dome is topped with a gilded, wooden pine cone, symbolizing both the importance of Boston's lumber industry during early colonial times and of the state of Maine, which was a district of the Commonwealth when the Bulfinch section of the building was completed.

Statuary
In front of the building is an equestrian statue of General Joseph Hooker. Other statues in front of the building include Daniel Webster, educator Horace Mann, and former US President John F. Kennedy. The statues of Anne Hutchinson and Mary Dyer are located on the lawns below the east and west wings. Inside the building is a statue of William Francis Bartlett, an officer in the Civil War.

Building interior

The original red-brick Bulfinch building contains the Governor's offices (on the west end) with the Massachusetts Senate occupying the former House of Representatives Chamber under the dome. The Massachusetts House of Representatives occupies a chamber on the west side of the Brigham addition. Hanging over this chamber is the "Sacred Cod", which was given to the House of Representatives in 1784 by a Boston merchant. The Sacred Cod symbolizes the importance of the fishing industry to the early Massachusetts economy.

The House Chamber is decorated with murals by Albert Herter, father of Massachusetts Gov. Christian Herter. Murals on the second floor under the dome were painted by artist Edward Brodney. Brodney won a competition to paint the first mural in a contest sponsored by the Works Progress Administration in 1936. It is entitled "Columbia Knighting Her World War Disabled". Brodney could not afford to pay models, and friends and family posed. The model for Columbia was Brodney's sister Norma Brodney Cohen, and the model for the soldier on one knee in the foreground was his brother Fred Brodney. In 1938, he painted a second mural under the dome called "World War Mothers". The models were again primarily friends and family members, with sister Norma sitting beside their mother Sarah Brodney. The New York Times notes that the murals are relatively rare examples of military art with women as their subjects.

A staircase in front of the Bulfinch building leads from Beacon Street to Doric Hall inside the building. The large main doors inside Doric Hall are only opened on three occasions:

 When the President of the United States or a foreign head of state visits.
 When the Governor exits the building on his or her last day in office. The Governor descends the staircase, crosses Beacon Street, and enters Boston Common, symbolically rejoining the people of Massachusetts as a private citizen.
 When a regimental flag is returned from battle. Since the regimental flags now return to Washington, D.C., this has not been done since the Vietnam War.

The Samuel Adams and Paul Revere time capsule is a metal box located in a cornerstone of the State House, placed there in the late 18th century and rediscovered in 2014. The contents include coins, newspaper clippings and other historical artifacts.

Offices

Constitutional Officers
The State House contains the primary offices of all the commonwealth's constitutional officers with exception of the Attorney General, who is based at the nearby McCormack Building.
Governor and Lieutenant Governor (Room 360)
Governor's Council (Room 184)
Secretary of the Commonwealth (Room 340)
Treasurer and Receiver-General (Room 227)
Auditor (Room 230)

Legislature
The majority of State House office space is given over to the Legislature. Every member of the House and Senate is assigned an office. Large third-floor suites are assigned to the House Speaker (Room 356) and Senate President (Room 332). Other offices include the House and Senate clerks, House and Senate counsel, and Legislative Information Services.

Press
One corridor of the building's fourth floor is a sort of Newspaper Row, anchored by the large Press Gallery suite where reporters from a range of publications maintain desks. The central Press Gallery room was given to use of reporters by the Legislature in 1909. The Massachusetts State House Press Association, established in 1909, governs these shared workspaces. Some individual news outlets have separate offices.
Press Gallery—Headquarters of State House reporters for Associated Press, WWLP-TV, the Eagle-Tribune papers, Lowell Sun, WGBH-FM, Springfield Republican/Masslive, and Politico
State House News Service newsroom
WBUR-FM State House bureau
Boston Globe State House bureau
Kevin McNicholas Room, a shared space for broadcast stations

Veterans' Organizations
A suite of rooms on the fifth floor is home to the Massachusetts headquarters of several veterans' groups, including the American Legion, American Legion Auxiliary, AMVETS, Disabled American Veterans, Italian American War Veterans of the United States, Jewish War Veterans of the United States of America, Korean War Veterans, Marine Corps League, Military Order of the Purple Heart, Persian Gulf Era Veterans, Polish Legion of American Veterans, Veterans of Foreign Wars, and Vietnam Veterans of America.

"Hub of the Solar System" nickname

One of Boston's most enduring nicknames, "The Hub of the Universe", stems from a remark by Oliver Wendell Holmes from his 1858 book The Autocrat of the Breakfast-Table in which he mentions the State House : "A jaunty-looking person ... said there was one more wise man's saying that he had heard; it was about our place—but he didn't know who said it. ... Boston State-House is the Hub of the Solar System. You couldn't pry that out of a Boston man if you had the tire of all creation straightened out for a crow-bar".

Gallery

See also
 List of National Historic Landmarks in Boston
 National Register of Historic Places listings in northern Boston, Massachusetts
 List of state and territorial capitols in the United States
 Statue of Henry Cabot Lodge
 History of early modern period domes

References
Notes

Sources
 Cupolas of Capitalism - State Capitol Building Histories (L-ME) (1998–2005). Cupola.com. May 17, 2005.
 The Evolution of the State House  (2005). Interactive State House. Mass.gov . May 17, 2005.

Further reading
 Bridgman, Arthur Milnor (1908) A Souvenir of Massachusetts legislators. Stoughton, Mass.: A.M. Bridgman.
 Kirker, Harold (1969) Architecture of Charles Bulfinch. Cambridge, Massachusetts: Harvard University Press.

External links

 A Tour of the Massachusetts State House
 Images of State House, various dates (via State Library of Massachusetts on Flickr)

State capitols in the United States
Beacon Hill, Boston
State House
State House
State House
Government buildings completed in 1798
Government buildings on the National Register of Historic Places in Massachusetts
Landmarks in Beacon Hill, Boston
National Historic Landmarks in Boston
Works Progress Administration in Massachusetts
1798 establishments in Massachusetts
18th-century architecture in the United States
Government buildings with domes
Charles Bulfinch buildings
Federal architecture in Massachusetts
Historic district contributing properties in Massachusetts
National Register of Historic Places in Boston